Gary Barber (born 1957) is a South African-born American film producer. Barber was the chairman and CEO of Metro-Goldwyn-Mayer. He is also co-founder of Spyglass Entertainment.

Biography 
Barber was born to a Jewish family in Johannesburg, South Africa. He was educated at King David School, Linksfield, in Johannesburg. He then received an accounting degree from the University of the Witwatersrand, also in Johannesburg. He later worked as a Chartered Accountant and Certified Public Accountant in South Africa and the United States, both with Price Waterhouse.

In 1982, he won a trip to the Arlington Million horse race in Illinois. In the same year, he moved to the United States, where his brother Cecil had been living since 1979. In the mid-1980s, Barber became a U.S. citizen. In 1998, he and Roger Birnbaum founded Spyglass Entertainment in Los Angeles. His highest-grossing film as producer was The Tourist (2010), which grossed close to US$280 million at the worldwide box office.

In December 2010, Barber became Chief Executive Officer of Metro-Goldwyn-Mayer (MGM). Under his leadership, MGM together with Eon Productions and Sony Pictures financed the successful James Bond film Skyfall, which grossed US$1,1 billion. MGM then also financed The Hobbit: An Unexpected Journey (2012), 21 Jump Street (2012) and Hansel & Gretel: Witch Hunters (2013). MGM then moved forward with remakes of RoboCop and Poltergeist. In March 2018, Barber was ousted from MGM, coming five months after the renewal of his contract with the studio to 2022; he received a $260M settlement.

Barber has three daughters and lives in Los Angeles.

Horse racing
Barber is also a Thoroughbred racehorse owner. The Deputy, owned in partnership with Team Valor, won the 2000 running of the Grade II Santa Catalina Stakes and the Grade I Santa Anita Derby at Santa Anita Park in Arcadia, California. In 2006, Becrux, also owned in partnership with Team Valor, won the Grade I Woodbine Mile at Woodbine Racetrack in Toronto, Canada. In 2014, his filly Lexie Lou won the Queen's Plate and was named the Canadian Horse of the Year. His horse War of Will won the 2019 Preakness Stakes.

Filmography

References

External links 
 Gary Barber Bio
 

1957 births
American film producers
American racehorse owners and breeders
American film studio executives
American people of South African-Jewish descent
Metro-Goldwyn-Mayer executives
Living people
University of the Witwatersrand alumni
South African emigrants to the United States
Jewish American film producers
Owners of King's Plate winners